Mati Raidma (born on 7 April 1965 Iisaku, Ida-Viru County) is an Estonian politician. He has been a member of IX, X, XI, XII, XIII and XIV Riigikogu. Since 2006, he belongs to Estonian Reform Party. From 2014 to 2015 he was the minister of the environment.

References

Living people
1965 births
Estonian Reform Party politicians
Members of the Riigikogu, 1999–2003
Members of the Riigikogu, 2007–2011
Members of the Riigikogu, 2011–2015
Members of the Riigikogu, 2015–2019
Members of the Riigikogu, 2019–2023
People from Alutaguse Parish